Judgement (also known under the title Hitz) is a 1992 drama film written and directed by William Sachs. Beside many known actors (including Cuba Gooding Jr. in his first feature film role), it also features appearances by actual gang members from Los Angeles. Due to its realism, Father Greg Boyle has used the film to show at-risk youths the dangers of gang life.

Production  
To research the film, William Sachs spent three months riding with the LAPD gang unit at night, and going to the juvenile court during the day. He originally intended the film to be a surrealistic satire on the justice system, but due to interference by the producers, the final film is partially a satire, partially a straight drama. Originally, for example, Sachs intended the film to start with a scene of the judge using a taser on himself, but the producers re-edited it for a more serious tone. Sachs himself therefore calls the final film "patchy and uneven". The film was shot in 1988, but, due to legal issues, released four years later, in 1992. Sachs cast actual gang members to appear in the film, some as thugs, some in other roles. He was impressed by their professional attitude on set, keeping gang rivalries out of the working environment.

Cast
The cast includes:
 Elliott Gould as Judge Callow
 Emilia Crow as Judge Chelsea Walker 
 Karen Black as Tiffany Powers 
 Ed Lauter as Dallas Hale 
 Sydney Lassick as Dr. Henry Silver 
 Francesco Quinn as Jimmy Sollera 
 Cuba Gooding Jr. as Officer Alvarez

References

External links

American drama films
1992 films
Films shot in Los Angeles
1992 drama films
1990s English-language films
Films directed by William Sachs
1990s American films